The Grand prix de littérature Paul-Morand is a French literary award, established by the Académie française in 1977 and handed out in 1980 for the first time. The prize goes to an author for their entire body of work. It is named after the writer Paul Morand. It is handed out every second year, alternately with the Grand prix de littérature de l'Académie française.

Laureates
 1980: Jean-Marie Le Clézio
 1982: 
 1984: Christine de Rivoyre 
 1986: 
 1988: Emil Cioran 
 1990: Jean-François Deniau 
 1992: Philippe Sollers 
 1994: Andrée Chedid 
 1996: Marcel Schneider 
 1998: Daniel Rondeau 
 2000: Patrick Modiano 
 2002: Jean-Paul Kauffmann 
 2004: Jean Rolin
 2006: Jean Echenoz
 2008: Jacques Roubaud
 2010: Olivier Rolin
 2012: Patrick Grainville
 2014: Gilles Lapouge
 2016: Not awarded
 2018: Charles Dantzig
 2020: 
 2022: Éric Neuhoff

References
 

Awards established in 1977
Académie Française awards